Kaalakkoothu is a 2018 Tamil language romantic drama film written and directed by M. Nagarajan. The film stars Prasanna, Kalaiyarasan, Dhansika, and Srushti Dange in the leading roles. Featuring music composed by Justin Prabhakaran, the film began production during April 2015 and released on 25 May 2018.

Plot 
The film opens with a new boy named Easwaran joining in Hari's class. Easwaran is instantly disliked because of his withdrawn nature. Hari picks a fight with Easwaran; during the fight, Easwaran breaks Hari's nose, and Hari brings his parents to school. Hari's mother, however, on coming to know that Easwaran is an orphan, tells him that she can consider him as his mother. However, in a few days time, she dies. At her funeral, Easwaran holds Hari's hand and consoles him.

Years later, Hari (Kalaiyarasan) is in a long-time relationship with a college girl named Gayathri (Dhansika), while a demure girl named Revathi (Srushti Dange) pines for Easwaran (Prasanna), who ignores her as he fears that something bad will happen to her. The heroes make a dangerous enemy in the form of a local mayor's son, who they beat up and break his hands for harassing Hari's sister. Meanwhile, Easwaran accepts Revathi due to Hari's efforts. Just when everything seems to be going fine, Revathi's father sees them together while they are returning from a short outing.

The next day, Revathi leaves to her native with her father and informs Easwaran that she will be back in four days. Both plan to take their relationship to the next level by making the elders of the family (Hari's father and Revathi's father) meet and arrange their wedding, but when they come four days later, Revathi is married off to someone else and seems to be happy. Easwaran is heartbroken. Hari, on the other hand, is infuriated and drinks to his fullest, which irks Gayathri and makes her leave angrily. The mayor's son demands his mother that he wants Easwaran dead, to which she agrees.

In the meantime, Gayathri's grandfather is adamant that he wants to see Gayathri engaged to her uncle before his health worsens. The family arranges for the engagement the next day, and the marriage is fixed a month later. Gayathri is worried about her love and informs Hari about the engagement. Gayathri elopes with Hari, and they marry the next day in a temple. Her family starts searching for her. On their first night, they get a call, and they rush to Gayathri's home. Her mother has committed suicide, and the family members do not allow Gayathri to see her mother even for one last time. Her father pushes her outside, and she hits her head on the gate and dies. An unconscious Gayathri sees her uncle and his men beating and killing Hari. While this is happening, Easwaran is on the way to Gayatri's house. He encounters the mayor's henchmen and escapes from them. He then arrives to see that both Hari and Gayathri are dead. The film ends with Easwaran getting killed by the mayor's brother.

Cast 
Prasanna as Easwaran
Kalaiyarasan as Hari
Dhansika as Gayathri
Srushti Dange as Revathi
R. N. R. Manohar as Gayathri's father
Rajyalakshmi as Gayathri's mother
Pondy Ravi
Thavasi

Production 
M. Nagarajan began the film in early 2015 with Kalaiyarasan and Shaam signed on to feature in the two leading roles. Shaam began working for the film in May 2015 and grew a beard for his role, before opting out as a result of differences with the director. Consequently, later on in the month, Prasanna was signed on as Shaam's replacement. The film continued shoot throughout Madurai and by June 2015, it was revealed that 40% of the film was completed.

Soundtrack 

The soundtrack album was composed by Justin Prabhakaran. The original soundtrack album featuring six songs was released on 4 January 2017.

References

External links 

2018 films
2010s Tamil-language films
Films shot in Madurai